Six Cylinder Love may refer to:
 Six Cylinder Love (1923 film), an American silent comedy film
 Six Cylinder Love (1931 film), an American pre-Code comedy film